is a railway station in the city of Iwata, Shizuoka Prefecture, Japan, operated by the third sector Tenryū Hamanako Railroad.

Lines
Shikijii Station is served by the Tenryū Hamanako Line, and is located 18.9 kilometers from the starting point of the line at Kakegawa Station.

Station layout
The station has one side platform serving a single bi-directional track. The wooden station building is unattended, but also serves as the local post office.

Adjacent stations

|-
!colspan=5|Tenryū Hamanako Railroad

Station history
Shikiji Station was established on June 1, 1940 when the section of the Japan National Railways Futamata Line was extended from Enshū-Mori Station to Kanasashi Station. After the privatization of JNR on March 15, 1987, the station came under the control of the Tenryū Hamanako Line.

Passenger statistics
In fiscal 2016, the station was used by an average of 59 passengers daily (boarding passengers only).

Surrounding area
Yamaha Motor Company Toyooka factory

See also
 List of Railway Stations in Japan

References

External links

  Tenryū Hamanako Railroad Station information 
 

Railway stations in Shizuoka Prefecture
Railway stations in Japan opened in 1940
Stations of Tenryū Hamanako Railroad
Iwata, Shizuoka